St George Hanover Square  was a civil parish in the metropolitan area of London, England

St George Hanover Square could also refer to:
St George's Hanover Square Church
St George's, Hanover Square (UK Parliament constituency), renamed Westminster St George's (UK Parliament constituency)